The Allan Shipping Line was started in 1819, by Captain Alexander Allan of Saltcoats, Ayrshire, trading and transporting between Scotland and Montreal, a route which quickly became synonymous with the Allan Line. By the 1830s the company had offices in Glasgow, Liverpool and Montreal. All five of Captain Allan's sons were actively involved with the business, but it was his second son, Sir Hugh Allan, who spearheaded the second generation. In 1854, Hugh launched the Montreal Ocean Steamship Company as part of the Allan Line, and two years later ousted Samuel Cunard to take control of the Royal Mail contract between Britain and North America. By the 1880s, the Allan Line was the world's largest privately owned shipping concern.

In 1891, the company took over the State Line (founded 1872) and was often referred to as the Allan & State Line. In 1897, Andrew Allan amalgamated the various branches of the Allan shipping empire under one company, Allan Line Steamship Company Ltd., of Glasgow. The company by then had added offices in Boston and London. In 1917, under Sir Montagu Allan, who represented the third generation of the Allan family, the company was purchased by Canadian Pacific Steamships, and by the following year the Allan name had disappeared from commercial shipping.

Media
The 1970s British television series The Onedin Line (1971-1980) is a complex and veiled take on the Allan Line Family and their steamships.

Notable collisions
In 1891, the Allan Line steamer Carthaginian collided with the York River Line steamer Charlotte in the shipping channel at Baltimore, Maryland. Among those aboard the Carthaginian was the Danish-American composer Asger Hamerik. While both boats were damaged, neither sank.

In 1905, the Allan Line steamer Parisian was involved in a collision with the Albano off of Halifax, Nova Scotia. The owners of the Albano were found by the Exchequer Court of Canada to be fully at fault, according to Reports of Cases Relating to Maritime Law. The case was later appealed to Canada's supreme court.

List of steamships 
The Allan Line fleet evolved over the course of decades, changing as new ships were added, lost at sea, sold, or scrapped:

 SS Alsatian - later RMS Empress of France
 SS America
 SS Anglo Saxon
 SS Assyrian
 SS Austrian
 SS Australasian (1857)
 SS Australasian (1901)
 SS Bavarian (1899)
 SS Bohemian
 SS Brazilian
 SS Buenos Ayrean
 SS Calgarian
 SS Californian
 SS Canadian (1854)
 SS Canadian (1859)
 SS Canadian (1872)
 SS Carthaginian 
 SS Caspian
 SS Castilian
 SS Circassian
 SS City of Vienna
 SS City of Bombay
 SS Corean 
 SS Corinthian 
 SS Corsican
 SS Damascus
 SS Diamant
 SS European
 SS Gallia
 SS Germany
 SS Grampian
 SS Grecian 
 SS Hanoverian
 SS Hesperian

 SS Hesperian
 SS Hibernian (1861)
 SS Hibernian (1888)
 SS Hibernian (1902)
 SS Hungarian (1859) 
 SS Hungarian (1902)
 SS Huronian
 SS Indian
 SS Ionian
 SS John Bell
 SS Jura
 SS Lake Erie
 SS Laurentian
 SS Livonian
 SS Lucerne
 SS Manitoban
 SS Melita
 SS Mersey
 SS Mongolian
 SS Monte Videan
 SS Moravian
 
 SS North American
 SS North Briton
 SS Norway
 SS Norwegian (1861)
 SS Norwegian (1865)
 SS Nova Scotian
 SS Numidian
 SS Ontarian
 SS Orcardian
 SS Ottawa
 SS Palestine
 SS Parisian

 SS Pretorian
 SS Prussian
 SS Peruvian
 SS Phoenician
 SS Polynesian
 SS Pomeranian
 SS Roacian 
 SS Roumanian
 SS Saint Andrew
 SS Saint David
 SS Saint George
 SS Saint Patrick
 SS Samaritan
 SS Sardinian
 SS Scandinavian (1869)
 SS Scandinavian (1898)
 
 SS Siberian (1946)   
 SS Sicilian
 SS Southwark
 SS State of California
 SS State of Georgia
 SS State of Indiana
 SS State of Nebraska
 SS State of Nevada
 SS State of Pennsylvania
 SS Sweden
 SS Tainui
 SS Tower Hill
 SS Tunisian
 SS Turanian
 RMS Victorian
 RMS Virginian
 SS Waldensian

References

Bibliography
 Appleton, Thomas E. (1974). Ravenscrag: The Allan Royal Mail Line.  Toronto: McClelland and Stewart.  (cloth)
  "C.P.R. Gets Allan Line; Report Declared to be Correct in Spite of Official Denials," New York Times. August 17, 1910.

External links 

 Allan Royal Mail Line - passenger lists and historical documents GG Archives

Defunct shipping companies of Canada
Transport companies disestablished in 1918
Transport companies established in 1819
1819 establishments in Scotland
1918 disestablishments in Scotland
British companies established in 1819
British companies disestablished in 1918